Vouga may refer to:
 Vouga River (Centro Region of Portugal)
 Vouga, Portugal, former municipality
 Saint Vouga (died 585), Irish priest who became a bishop in Brittany